Trenčianske or Trencianske may refer to:

Trenčianske Bohuslavice, village and municipality in Nové Mesto nad Váhom District in western Slovakia
Trenčianske Jastrabie, village and municipality in Trenčín District in north-western Slovakia
Trenčianske Mitice, village and municipality in Trenčín District in north-western Slovakia
Trenčianske Stankovce, village and municipality in Trenčín District in north-western Slovakia
Trenčianske Teplice, health resort and small spa town in western Slovakia